Pratap Lal Bheel (born 6 January 1969) is an Indian politician who is an elected member from Gogunda Assembly constituency in Udaipur district of Rajasthan. And he is a member of the Bharatiya Janata Party.

Controversy

In 2021, Pratap Lal Bheel was accused of raping twice.

References

1969 births
Living people
Rajasthan MLAs 2018–2023
People from Udaipur
Bharatiya Janata Party politicians from Rajasthan